Edward Canfield Fuller (September 4, 1893 – June 12, 1918) was an officer in the United States Marine Corps and the son of General Ben Hebard Fuller.

Biography
Born in Hamilton, Virginia, Fuller was a member of the Naval Academy class of 1916, and was commissioned in the Marine Corps upon graduation.

Captain Fuller was killed in action in the Battle of Belleau Wood in France June 12, 1918 during World War I.

According to his citation he died while fearlessly exposing himself in an artillery barrage in order to get his men into a safer position. He was posthumously awarded the Distinguished Service Cross by the Army for his selfless sacrifice for his men.

Awards and decorations

Navy Cross

Distinguished Service Cross

Silver Star

Commendations
Fuller has been awarded the following:

Honors
The destroyer USS Fuller (DD-297) was named for him.

In July 1918, a Marine Corps training camp in Paoli, Pennsylvania, located on the grounds where the American Revolutionary War Battle of Paoli was fought, was named for him.

See also

References

1893 births
1918 deaths
People from Hamilton, Virginia
United States Marine Corps officers
United States Naval Academy alumni
Recipients of the Distinguished Service Cross (United States)
American military personnel killed in World War I
United States Marine Corps personnel of World War I
Military personnel from Virginia